Andrea Noè (born 15 January 1969) is an Italian former professional road bicycle racer, who competed as a professional between 1993 and 2011, always racing with Italian teams. One of his greatest achievements was winning stage 11 in the 1998 Giro d'Italia.

In the 2007 Giro d'Italia, Noè, aged 38 at the time, took the leaders pink jersey on the extremely long stage 10 after outclimbing his breakaway companions of two days earlier. He finished 1:08 ahead of the second placed rider Marzio Bruseghin and 2:58 of his  team captain and 2005 UCI ProTour Champion, Danilo Di Luca. He held onto the jersey for a second day before relinquishing it to Di Luca.

Major results

1992
 3rd Overall Girobio
 3rd Giro d'Oro
1994
 4th Overall Vuelta a Murcia
 4th Overall Tour Méditerranéen
1995
 7th Overall Tour Méditerranéen
 9th Giro di Toscana
 10th Gran Premio Industria e Commercio di Prato
1996
 3rd Overall Tour de Pologne
 5th Giro dell'Appennino
 8th Overall Setmana Catalana de Ciclisme
 9th Overall Tour de Romandie
 9th Overall Critérium International
1997 
 5th Overall Escalada a Montjuïc
 7th La Flèche Wallonne
 7th Milano–Torino
 8th Overall Critérium International
 9th Trofeo dello Scalatore
 10th Milan–San Remo
1998
 Giro d'Italia
1st Stage 11 
Held  after Stage 13 
 9th Overall Setmana Catalana de Ciclisme
1999
 5th Milano–Torino
 6th Overall Tour de Romandie
 8th Paris–Bourges
2000
 4th Overall Giro d'Italia
 4th Overall Tour de Romandie
1st Stage 4
 4th Giro dell'Appennino
 5th Overall Giro del Trentino
 8th Coppa Bernocchi
 9th Overall Tour of Sweden
2001
 6th Overall Giro d'Italia
 8th Overall Settimana Internazionale Coppi e Bartali
 8th Giro dell'Appennino
 9th Overall Giro del Trentino
2002
 4th La Flèche Wallonne
 6th Overall Tour de Romandie
 8th Overall Tour of the Basque Country
 8th Tour du Haut Var
2003
 2nd Overall Tour de Pologne
 4th Overall Giro d'Italia
 5th Clásica de San Sebastián
 6th Giro dell'Emilia
 8th Overall Vuelta a Andalucía
 10th Overall Tirreno–Adriatico
2004
 5th Overall Settimana Internazionale Coppi e Bartali
 7th Overall Route du Sud
 9th Giro del Lazio
 10th Giro del Veneto
2005
 5th GP Industria Artigianato e Commercio Carnaghese
 7th Milano–Torino
 8th Giro dell'Appennino
 10th Gran Premio di Chiasso
2007
 Giro d'Italia 
1st Stage 1 (TTT)
Held  after Stages 10 & 11
 3rd Overall Tour de Slovénie
 7th Overall Giro del Trentino
 9th Tre Valli Varesine
 10th GP Lugano
2008
 7th Tre Valli Varesine
 8th Overall Deutschland Tour
 8th Tre Valli Varesine
 10th Overall Settimana Internazionale Coppi e Bartali
2010
 4th Overall Tour de Slovénie
 7th GP Lugano

Grand Tour general classification results timeline

References

External links

1969 births
Living people
People from Magenta, Lombardy
Italian male cyclists
Italian Giro d'Italia stage winners
Cyclists from the Metropolitan City of Milan